RAGBRAI is an acronym and registered trademark for the Register's Annual Great Bicycle Ride Across Iowa, which is a non-competitive bicycle ride organized by The Des Moines Register. The course runs across the state of Iowa from west to east, and draws recreational riders from across the world. First held in 1973, RAGBRAI is the largest bike-touring event in the world.

Description
Riders begin at a community on Iowa's western border and ride to a community on the eastern border, stopping in towns across the state. The ride is one week long, ending on the last Saturday of July each year, after beginning on the previous Sunday. The earliest possible starting date is July 19 and the latest is July 25.

RAGBRAI holds an annual lottery that selects about 8,500 week-long riders. The lottery is held beginning November 15 of the previous year and until April 1, with random computer selection determines the participants. Entrants are notified of the lottery results by email on May 1. Additionally, passes on a first-come, first-served basis are made available for 1,500 day riders; these are limited to three per person. Iowa bicycle clubs and charters, as well as teams and groups (many from out of state), also receive a number of passes for which members apply through those organizations. Despite the official limits, unregistered riders have on many days swelled the actual number of riders to well over the registered number count.

The length of the entire week's route over RAGBRAI's first 40 years from 1973 through 2012, not including the Century Loop, averaged , with the average daily distance between host communities being . Eight "host communities" are selected each year, one each for the beginning and end points, the other six serving as overnight stops from Sunday through Friday for the bicyclists. At the beginning of the ride, participants traditionally dip the rear wheels of their bikes in or near the starting community. A dipping spot has always been set up in either the Missouri River or the Big Sioux River. At the end, the riders dip their front wheels in the Mississippi River.

The 45th ride, RAGBRAI XLV, took place from July 23–29, 2017, beginning in Orange City, with overnight stops in Spencer, Algona, Clear Lake, Charles City, Cresco, and Waukon, before finishing in Lansing. In 2017, the "Mile of Silence", which remembers the riders who have been lost throughout the years, happened on the first day after leaving Granville. The optional 3rd Annual Gravel Loop also occurred the first day on the way to Sutherland. The 46th ride, RAGBRAI XLVI, was held from July 22–28, 2018, beginning in Onawa, with overnight stops in Denison, Jefferson, Ames, Newton, Sigourney, and Iowa City, before ending in Davenport. The 2019 (47th, RAGBRAI XLVII, July 21–27) began in Council Bluffs, with overnight stops in Atlantic, Winterset, Indianola, Centerville, Fairfield, and Burlington, ending in Keokuk.

On April 20, 2020, due to the COVID-19 pandemic, the decision was made to postpone the 48th ride, RAGBRAI XLVIII. The rescheduled ride began on July 25, 2021, in Le Mars and ended July 31 in Clinton, with stops in Sac City, Fort Dodge, Iowa Falls, Waterloo, Anamosa, and DeWitt. The planned 2020 route had included overnight stops in Storm Lake and Maquoketa but were replaced by Sac City and DeWitt, respectively, for the 2021 route.

Overnight stops

The ride has passed through all 99 of Iowa's counties in its history. Fourteen communities have served as the starting point, while 12 have hosted the finish and 108 other communities have been overnight hosts during the week of the ride.

An event known as the RAGBRAI Route Announcement Party is held the last part of January to release the names of the overnight towns. The route is fleshed out in the following weeks and is announced in the Register and on the RAGBRAI website in early March. Even after that, changes to the route have sometimes been made.

History

The Great Six-Day Bicycle Ride (1973)
RAGBRAI began in 1973, when Des Moines Register feature writers John Karras and Donald Kaul decided to go on a bicycle ride across Iowa; both men were avid cyclists. Karras challenged Kaul to do the ride and write articles about what he experienced. Kaul agreed to do it, but only if Karras also did the ride. Karras then agreed to ride, as well.

The newspaper's management approved of the plan. Don Benson, a public-relations director at the Register, was assigned to coordinate the event. Upon the suggestion of Ed Heins, the managing editor, the writers invited the public to accompany them.

The ride was planned to start on Sunday, August 26 in Sioux City and end in Davenport on Friday, August 31. The overnight stops were Storm Lake, Fort Dodge, Ames, Des Moines, and Williamsburg. The Register informed readers of the event and the planned route. The ride was informally referred to as "the Great Six-Day Bicycle Ride".

Some 300 cyclists began the ride in Sioux City; 114 of them rode the entire route. A number of other people rode part of the route.  Attendance was light the first year. The ride was announced with only six weeks' notice and it conflicted with the first week of school and the final weekend of the Iowa State Fair.

After the ride was over, Kaul and Karras wrote numerous articles that captured the imaginations of many readers. Among those who completed the 1973 ride was 83-year-old Clarence Pickard of Indianola. He rode a used ladies Schwinn and wore a long-sleeved shirt, trousers, woolen long underwear, and a silver pith helmet. He said that the underwear blocked out the sun and kept his skin cool.  The newspaper received many calls and letters from people who wanted to go on the ride, but were unable to for various reasons.  Because of this public response and demand, a second ride was scheduled for August 4–10, 1974, before the Iowa State Fair.

Second year: SAGBRAI, August 4–10, 1974
The 1974 ride, known as the Second Annual Great Bicycle Ride Across Iowa (or SAGBRAI), was more carefully planned. For example, each morning, the official start time was 7:30 am; however, by Wednesday, the start time was dropped so that riders could depart at any time that was appropriate for the rider. The Iowa State Patrol was involved for the first time to control traffic and assure safety, and arrangements were made to have medical services available for riders. For the first time, the route was driven in advance for inspection purposes. The start of the ride was in Council Bluffs, with the overnight communities of Atlantic, Guthrie Center, Camp Dodge (near Des Moines), Marshalltown, Waterloo, and Monticello, and finishing in the riverfront city of Dubuque. The ride occurred in the same week as the resignation of President Richard M. Nixon. The high point of the trip for many of the riders was the second overnight stop, where a sign greeted the riders outside of the designated overnight town, Guthrie Center. It read, "Please be kind. You outnumber us two to one." About a half hour in length, SAGBRAI – the Second Annual Great Bike Ride Across Iowa is a black and white documentary film about the 1974 ride. OHP Marketing Services of Webster City, Iowa, converted the 16-mm film to a digital format in 2012, and the digital format was screened in Webster City on Monday July 13, 2015.

As RAGBRAI annual event
After the second year, the ride continued to grow in popularity.  Michael Gartner, then the editor of the Register, directed John Karras to include the word "Register" in the ride title; thus the RAGBRAI name, with Roman numerals following it, was adopted for RAGBRAI III in 1975 (the 2012 ride was RAGBRAI XL).

Until 2014, it also had the fewest feet in vertical hill climbing. Beginning in 1978, RAGBRAI included a 100-mile century ride to offer a greater challenge.

The second day of RAGBRAI IX came to be known as "Soggy Monday" and is generally regarded as the worst weather day in RAGBRAI history.  To commemorate it, the Register marketed a bicycle patch.

Beginning with RAGBRAI X, the dates were moved to the last full week in July, starting on Sunday and ending on Saturday. This ride was also the last for Donald Kaul as co-host; he had ridden with John Karras on the first ten rides. Chuck Offenburger, writer of the Register'''s "Iowa Boy" column, joined Karras as co-host in 1983.

With XIV, RAGBRAI introduced a Century Loop.  While the day's ride might be shorter, a loop was included on the route for cyclists who wanted to ride . This ride went from Council Bluffs to Muscatine, and the optional loop was on the day between Perry and Eldora. The loop was renamed the "Karras Loop" in 2001, in honor of John Karras.

On the XXIII ride, the day from Tama-Toledo to Sigourney featured a strong south headwind, much heat and humidity, and many hills. The day came to be known as "Saggy Thursday".

After the XXV ride, which passed through Lucas County, RAGBRAI in its history had gone through all of Iowa's 99 counties.

John Karras retired as co-host after the 2000 ride (XXVIII), which begin at Council Bluffs and ended at Burlington.

RAGBRAI XLIII in 2015 was the first to feature an optional gravel loop. The loop was in honor of Steve Hed, the Minnesotan founder of HED Cycling Products and wheel innovator, who had died the previous November. The first gravel loop was part of the second-day ride from Storm Lake to Fort Dodge. Also, the 43rd ride was the first since the initial ride in 1973 to start in Sioux City and end in Davenport.

Notable incidents
Deaths
Over the first 42 years of the ride (through 2014), 30 deaths of ride participants or volunteers have officially occurred during the week of RAGBRAI because of accidents or injuries suffered on the ride.  Although the event began in 1973, the first death did not occur until RAGBRAI XII in 1984.  Many of the deaths were due to heart attacks that riders suffered while resting.  However, in Sheldon on the first night of the 2005 ride, a weather-related fatality occurred as Michael Thomas Burke (a native of Donnellson, Iowa and an industrial engineering graduate from the University of Iowa, who was living in New York City) died when a storm caused a tree limb to fall on him as he was sleeping in a tent.

Only a few deaths resulted from injuries sustained while actually riding on bicycles. The first was in 1987, when 19-year-old John Boyle of Rockwell City fell under the wheels of a flatbed trailer.  On Monday, July 30, 2007, at 12:52 pm, a Waterloo man, who was rescued from the Wapsipinicon River in Independence, subsequently died; 62-year-old Rich Droste had been participating in RAGBRAI, which made an overnight stop in Independence on Thursday. Droste was swimming in the Wapsi when he apparently got caught in the current upstream from the dam. On July 25, 2009, Donald D. Myers from Rolla, Missouri, died of injuries sustained in a crash at the bottom of the hill near Geode Lake dam at Geode State Park.  On July 30, 2010, Stephen Briggs of Waverly, Iowa died after his bike clipped the tire of another bike and he was thrown from his bike.

After Briggs' death, no more fatalities occurred until 2014, when on Monday, July 21, Tom Teesdale, 62, of West Branch died of a heart attack between Terril and Graettinger, and on Wednesday, July 23, George 'Frank' Brinkerhoff of Sioux City died of natural causes and was found dead in his tent Thursday morning. On Sunday, July 24, 2016, at the 2-mile marker on US Highway 34 near Glenwood, Wayne Ezell, 72, of Jacksonville, Florida, was westbound when a pickup truck driven by Robb Philippus, 34, of Glenwood, hit him from behind about 6:40 am. Ezell, who died from his injuries sustained during the accident, was a rider participating in RAGBRAI XLIV. Also, in 2016, on the Tuesday of RAGBRAI XLIV, a 60-year-old RAGBRAI rider, Clifton Kahler, had a heart attack while riding along Highway 2 between Creston and Leon and died.

A plane carrying a pilot and a young Canadian woman who was making a documentary about the ride crashed during the course of the 2005 RAGBRAI. In this case, the pair suffered minor injuries.  Pilot Jim Hill of Manchester, Iowa, and Amy Throop of Ottawa, Canada, were following the route on a plane near Riceville, Iowa, when the plane went down. Both Hill and Throop walked away from the accident. Throughout the ride, ultralights have flown over riders a few feet above the trees to get good shots of the riders.

Crawford County lawsuit and ban
During 2004's RAGBRAI XXXII, Kirk Ullrich was thrown from his bicycle after contacting a crack in the center of the road and died.  Ullrich's widow Betty Jo Ullrich sued Crawford County and settled for $350,000. The board of supervisors for Crawford County banned RAGBRAI (and other, similar events) to avoid future liability. As of December 2008, however, Crawford County supervisors voted to rescind this ban after the RAGBRAI organizers took steps to indemnify third parties in the case of such events in the future.

2013 sinkhole along XLI route
The Iowa Department of Natural Resources (DNR) contacted the Iowa Department of Transportation, which deemed the sinkhole to be unsafe. The Iowa DNR immediately evacuated the campers at Springbrook. In the spring (March, April, and May) of 2013, according to Harry Hillaker, the state of Iowa climatologist, Iowa had the wettest spring on record. The record precipitation, both rainfall and snowfall, contributed to the formation of the sinkhole. On June 3, 2013, the RAGBRAI XLI route inspection preride assessed the sinkhole in considering changes to the route through Springbrook and up Mockingbird Hill, the steepest hill on any RAGBRAI route; however, no changes to the RAGBRAI XLI route were made.

Food vendors
During RAGBRAI, food and drink are available at nominal cost in campgrounds, churches, and restaurants, and along the route. Vendors who are officially sanctioned are identified by a sign reading, OFFICIAL RAGBRAI VENDOR. Many offer a discount to riders who have a participant wristband.  Perhaps the most famed vendor in RAGBRAI history was Paul Bernhard, who along the day's route at a rural location sold corn on the cob and pork chops that were basted in melted butter and grilled over charcoal. He began selling chops at RAGBRAI in 1985 and retired after the 2008 ride, leaving the vendorship to his son, Matt. In 1996, he sold 2500 chops in his hometown of Bancroft, Iowa, when the ride passed through there. He was called Mr. Pork Chop and was known for his cry of "Pooooork Chooooooooooop!" He died at age 88.

Teams and charters

Riders come from all over the world, and many ride as clubs or teams. Dozens of organized teams go on the ride.  In 2007 and 2008, Lance Armstrong organized a LIVESTRONG team of about 200 riders and participated in RAGBRAI; each rider raised $1000 or more towards fighting cancer.

Teams create a social and support system that adds a noncycling dimension to RAGBRAI. While some of the teams have a well-earned reputation for hard partying and heavy drinking, most are serious bicyclists. Teams often customize old school buses and vans. The team buses serve as transportation to and from the ride, and a combination clubhouse and sleeping quarters during the ride. These buses typically sport enormous custom stereos, roof mounted, rail-equipped platforms, which serve as bicycle racks and a place to relax, and interior bathrooms. Several carry 55-gallon plastic water barrels, which become warm during the day. Attached to a gravity-fed hose, they provide teams with a spartan shower at the end of the day's ride.

Teams often conform their clothing or partake in certain gimmicks to add levity to the ride and make team members easily identifiable.  This can be as simple as wearing identical cycling jerseys with the team logo or various wacky traditions such as purple “troll hair” wigs (Team Spin).  Gimmicks include adorning road kill along the route with Mardi Gras beads (Team Road Kill), various drinking games, and a team who carries 5-gallon buckets on their bicycles and challenge riders to “Get on the Bucket” and get tackled off of it by a team member or friend  to raise awareness for cancer research (Team Tacklebucket).  Many teams also produce logoed team paraphernalia to distribute and trade with other teams (stickers, bracelets, or can koozies being common items).

Charters are bicycle clubs and for-profit companies that provide weeklong support for riders. For a fee, charters typically transport riders to and from the ride, secure preferred camping areas, rent and sometimes pitch tents, provide some bicycle repair services, and offer additional evening social activities. Charters are a common option for riders coming from outside Iowa.

Team Gourmet, based in Chicago, is a group that currently works RAGBRAI and has done so for more than 20 years.  They travel with three chefs, who prepare elaborate meals that are served at 6:00 pm.  Membership in the team for RAGBRAI and the cuisine included cost around $900.  Another charter from Chicago is CUBS, which stands for Chicago Urban Bicycling Society, formed in 1996 especially to ride RAGBRAI.  Other charters and clubs involved with RAGBRAI XLII in 2014 include: Team Jorts, Bicycle Illinois, Shuttleguy, Brancel Charters, Bubba's Pampered Pedalers, Out of Staters, Pork Belly Ventures, Riverbend Bike Club, Quad Cities Bicycle Club, Lost & Found Adventures, Bike World, Lake Country Cyclist Ankeny, RAGBRAI In Style, Emmetsburg Bike Club, Bikes To You, Bicyclists of Iowa City, Iowa Valley Bicycle Club, North Iowa Touring Club, Melon City Bike Club, Cedar Valley Cyclists, The Pfalcons, Overland Touring Charter, Padre's Cycle Inn, and Ron Oman Charters.  The Sprint Selzer Bicycle Club is among the longest-running clubs in existence, having formed at RAGBRAI III, by creating a fictional celebrity named Sprint.  Team Skunk, the second oldest team on RAGBRAI, goes by the motto "Tails Up!"  Most members come from the Ames/Des Moines area, but membership has included riders from 20+ states and several foreign countries.

Media exposure
RAGBRAI has had nationwide media exposure, and other rides based on RAGBRAI have been started in other areas of the country. Bil Gilbert, after riding in SAGBRAI, wrote an enthusiastic report that appeared in Sports Illustrated. After Gilbert's essay, additional writers with Sports Illustrated have mentioned RAGBRAI over the years. In April 1984, Fredric Dannen wrote an article for the Saturday Evening Post.  Harry Smith of CBS This Morning rode part of RAGBRAI XXV in 1997 and aired a report. In addition, numerous articles about the ride have appeared over the years in The Wall Street Journal. Following RAGBRAI XLVII in August 2019, Lonely Planet listed RAGBRAI as one of the top 50 bicycle rides in both North America and South America combined in the book Epic Bike Rides of the Americas and, in the book, included Dennis Coello's picture of a brightly colored support vehicle with the lyrics to The B-52's song "Love Shack" on the side of the Iowa Falls middle school principal Jeff Burchfield's Team Love Shack RAGBRAI bus of Hardin County, Iowa which supports the group of about 20 riders on Team Love Shack, a RAGBRAI team which was established with about 5 or 6 riders in 2007 for RAGBRAI XXXV but, in 2010 for RAGBRAI XXXVIII, purchased an old school bus as the support vehicle for Team Love Shack and had the bus painted accordingly according to Scott Kosanke of Team Love Shack''. Although RAGBRAI XLVIII was postponed from 2020 until 2021 because of the Coronavirus Pandemic, news media covered Team Love Shack of Hardin County and especially the Eldora, Iowa area participating in an unofficial ride along the XLVIII route during July 2020. Also in August 2019, CNN featured a travel story "RAGBRAI: A newbie's guide to cycling across Iowa" by Christi Scott.

Celebrities and athletes
Ben Davidson, former professional football star player mainly with the Oakland Raiders, rode on RAGBRAI for several years, beginning in 1987. Lance Armstrong rode the Wednesday and Thursday stages in 2006, speaking to a large throng of the riders in Newton.  He then completed most of the 2007 ride before leaving a couple of days early to support Team Discovery's Alberto Contador and his Tour de France victory.  In 2008, Armstrong also made an appearance on the Ames, Iowa, leg of the trip.  In 2011, 2013, 2014, 2017, and 2018, he again participated.  Ottumwa-born actor/comedian Tom Arnold has ridden a few RAGBRAIs, including XXIV in 1996.  Other participants have included three-time Tour de France champ Greg LeMond, columnist Dave Barry, NASCAR drivers Matt Kenseth and Jimmie Johnson, Motocross champion Ryan Dungey, 2004 Democratic presidential candidate Howard Dean and former Secretary of the Interior Bruce Babbitt.
Colorado governor and Democratic Presidential candidate John Hickenlooper rode in the 2019 ride.  Hickenlooper, his spouse and his crew joined Team Skunk in Indionola where he provided a keg of his signature beer while using the shower of the host home.

See also
 Challenge riding
 List of RAGBRAI overnight stops
 Tour of the Scioto River Valley (TOSRV), a large two day bicycle tour started in 1962.

References

Magazines

Books

Film

External links

Bicycle tours
Iowa culture
Cycling in Iowa
Cycling events in the United States
Festivals in Iowa
Recurring events established in 1973
Annual sporting events in the United States
1973 establishments in Iowa